Pan's box turtle (Cuora pani) is a species of turtle in the family Geoemydidae (formerly Bataguridae). The yellow-headed box turtle is sometimes included herein as a subspecies (Cuora pani aurocapitata).

Etymology
The specific name, pani, is probably in honor of Chinese herpetologist Pan Lei.

The common name, Pan's box turtle, refers to the ability of C. pani to seal itself within its shell.

Geographic range
Cuora pani pani, the nominotypical subspecies, is endemic to the central Chinese provinces of Shaanxi, Sichuan, and Hubei (Blanck & Tang, 2005).

References

External links
 Listed as Critically Endangered (CR A1d+2d).

Further reading
Blanck T, Tang M (2005). "Ein neuer Fundort von Cuora pani SONG, 1984 mit Diskussion über den taxonomischen Status von Cuora pani und Cuora aurocapitata". SACALIA 7 (3), 2005: 16-37.
Song, Ming-tao (1984). "A new species of the turtle genus Cuora (Testudoformes: Testudinidae)". Acta Zootaxonomica Sinica 9 (3): 330-332. (Cuora pani, new species). (in Chinese, with summary in English).

Reptiles of China
Cuora
Reptiles described in 1984
Taxonomy articles created by Polbot
Critically endangered fauna of China